"Piccadilly Palare" is a song by British singer Morrissey, released as a single in October 1990. The song features one of Morrissey's former colleagues from the Smiths, Andy Rourke, marking the last time any former member of the Smiths would collaborate with Morrissey. Background vocals were provided by Suggs, lead singer of the band Madness. "Piccadilly Palare" reached number 18 on the UK Singles Chart and number five in Ireland.

Song information
As with "November Spawned a Monster", Morrissey chose to write about a subject unusual in pop music, namely male prostitution around the Piccadilly area of London. The title of the song refers to the cant slang language polari, first used by male prostitutes in the 19th century and then taken up by homosexuals in the 1960s to disguise sexual activities which were illegal in the UK until 1967. Morrissey said in his autobiography that he disliked the song. He called it "...a student work of novelty that wears off before noon".

Critical reception
NME gave "Piccadilly Palare" a positive review, saying "It's amazing what a slap across the wrist can do for the creative juices." Ned Raggett of AllMusic called the song "another glam-touched chugger, its emotional heft provided by the wounded, bitter lyrics."

Track listings
7-inch vinyl and cassette
 "Piccadilly Palare"
 "Get Off the Stage"

12-inch vinyl and CD
 "Piccadilly Palare"
 "At Amber" (Morrissey/Street) Produced By Stephen Street
 "Get Off the Stage" (Morrissey/Rourke)

Musicians
 Morrissey – vocals
 Kevin Armstrong – guitar
 Andy Rourke – bass guitar
 Andrew Paresi – drums

Charts

Release details

References

Morrissey songs
1990 singles
1990 songs
His Master's Voice singles
LGBT-related songs
Songs about prostitutes
Song recordings produced by Alan Winstanley
Song recordings produced by Clive Langer
Songs written by Morrissey
Songs about language